Oleh Synytsya (born 20 March 1996) is a Ukrainian professional footballer who plays as a midfielder for Świt Szczecin.

Career
Synytsya is a product of the FC Metalist School System, where he trained from age 6. From 2009 till 2013 he played 38 games and scored 1 goal in the Ukrainian Youth Football League.

On 31 July 2013 he made his debut for Metalist U-19 team in a match against Zorya Luhansk.

On 1 August 2014 he made his debut for Metalist U-21 team against Dynamo Kyiv U-21 Team.

On 8 April 2015 he made his debut for FC Metalist as a substitute in a match against FC Shakhtar Donetsk on 73 minute of game.

He made his debut for FC Metalist in the match against FC Chornomorets Odesa on 6 December 2015 in the Ukrainian Premier League.

References

External links
 
 

1996 births
Living people
Footballers from Kharkiv
Ukrainian footballers
Association football midfielders
Ukrainian expatriate footballers
FC Metalist Kharkiv players
Ukrainian Premier League players
Ukrainian First League players
Ukrainian Second League players
III liga players
FC Metalist 1925 Kharkiv players
FC Rukh Lviv players
FK Ventspils players
FC Ahrobiznes Volochysk players
Expatriate footballers in Latvia
Ukrainian expatriate sportspeople in Latvia
Expatriate footballers in Poland
Ukrainian expatriate sportspeople in Poland